State Secret is a 1950 British drama thriller film directed by Sidney Gilliat and starring Douglas Fairbanks Jr., Jack Hawkins, Glynis Johns, Olga Lowe and Herbert Lom. It was made at Isleworth Studios with Italian location shooting in Trento and the Dolomites. It was released in the United States under the title The Great Manhunt.

Plot
John Marlowe is an American surgeon visiting England when he is invited to Vosnia (a fictitious East-European country) to receive the "Kepler Gold Medal" for his contributions to medical science, and, coincidentally, to demonstrate his new techniques on a patient. Midway through the operation, he discovers that he is operating on the Vosnian dictator, General Niva. Niva dies during the recovery period. From talking beforehand with Colonel Galcon, the Minister of Health, Minister of Public Services and Minister for State Security, Marlowe is certain he is doomed—he knows too much—so he makes his escape while Galcon is distracted by Niva's death. With elections coming soon, the general is replaced by a double, and Marlowe is hunted by the state police.

Marlowe's attempts to telephone and reach the American embassy nearly get him captured. While hiding in a theater during a show, he notices a woman singing in English. He goes backstage and enlists the help of the reluctant, half-English Lisa. Marlowe has an idea: inside the coat he was accidentally given in a barber shop, by the barber, they find a wallet containing the ID of a Karl Theodor, and foreign currency, the possession of which is a capital offense in Vosnia. They blackmail the smuggler Theodor into helping them. They are pursued across the country and are on the point of escaping across the border when one of Karl's men, who is leading them across the mountains, is shot by a border guard and killed, and Lisa is wounded. Marlowe refuses to abandon her, and is captured by Galcon's men.

Galcon arranges a "shooting accident" for Marlowe, but as he is about to walk outside to his fate, the substitute for dictator Niva makes a live speech on the radio, and shots are heard. Galcon confirms by telephone that the stand-in has been assassinated. As the people have witnessed the death of Niva, albeit the fake Niva, it is no longer necessary to maintain the cover-up, nor to eliminate Marlowe and Robinson, who are subsequently released and fly to freedom in the West, and ultimately to their new life together in America.

Cast

 Douglas Fairbanks Jr. as Dr. John Marlowe
 Glynis Johns as Lisa Robinson
 Olga Lowe as Baba (the taller "Sister Robinson")
 Therese van Kye as Teresa (the shorter "Sister Robinson")
 Jack Hawkins as Colonel Galcon
 Walter Rilla as General Niva
 Karel Stepanek as Dr. Revo
 Leonard Sachs as Dr. Poldoi
 Herbert Lom as Theodor
 Robert Ayres as Buckman
 Howard Douglas as Clubman  
 Martin Boddey as Clubman  
 Russell Waters as Clubman  
 Arthur Howard as Clubman
 Carl Jaffé as Prada
 Gerard Heinz as Bendel
 Leo Bieber as Man at Telephone Box
 Nelly Arno as Shop Woman
 Paul Demel as Barber
 Danny Green as Taxi Driver
 Anton Diffring as State Policeman
 Peter Illing as Macco
 Arthur Reynolds as Compere
 Richard Molinas as Red Nose
 Eric Pohlmann as Cable Car Conductor
 Hans Moser as Sigrist
 Louis Wiechert as Christian
 Gerik Schjelderup as Bartorek
 Henrik Jacobsen as Mountain Soldier
 Guido Lorraine as Lieutenant Prachi

Production

Development
Gilliat got the idea for making the film from a newspaper article he read shortly before World War II. He decided it would make a "chase thriller" in the style of films he had written for Alfred Hitchcock and Carol Reed, notably The Lady Vanishes and Night Train to Munich. He found it difficult to do during the war years but reactivated it after the war.

The fictitious "Vosnian" language was constructed for the film by a linguistics expert, combining Latin and Slavic based elements.

The star role went to Douglas Fairbanks Jr., who had made a number of British films in the 1930s and was keen to work in the country again. His casting was announced in May 1949.

Fairbanks later said "We have definitely reached a One World status in pictures. British comedy and character acting do not seem remote to us any more."

In July it was announced that another Hollywood star would play the female lead but by August, actress Glynis Johns got the role.

Filming
Filming began in August 1949. Although there was some filming done at Isleworth Studios in London, Gilliat wanted to make as much of the film on location. There was eight weeks on location filming, in Trento and the Dolomites. Trento stood in for the fictitious capital. Filming finished by November 1949.

Fairbanks later said filming was difficult as some in Italy thought the film was anti-communist while others said it was pro-communist, and the film unit had to avoid riots. Gilliat said the filming unions were particularly difficult during the making of this film.

Reception

Critical reception
In The New York Times, Bosley Crowther wrote, "... this picture is just about as lively as they come, and under Mr. Gilliat's direction, it moves like an auto gaining speed ... Beautifully photographed in Italian cities and in the Italian Dolomites, the whole adventure has the eminent advantage of a sparkling Continental atmosphere. And it also has the advantage of good performance by all concerned—by Mr. Fairbanks as the kidnapped surgeon, looking a little like Eugene O'Neill; by Miss Johns, very saucy and explosive, as the music-hall girl; by Jack Hawkins as the Vosnian premier [sic], with an Oxford accent and a Nazi attitude; by Herbert Lom as the Balkan shyster and any number of others in small roles."

Box office
Trade papers called the film a "notable box office attraction" in British cinemas in 1950. It was one of five successful movies from London Films that year, the others being The Wooden Horse, The Happiest Days of Your Life, Odette and Seven Days to Noon. 

State Secret was less popular in the US but Fairbanks Jr. said "I thought I did my best work ever; Sidney really kept the pot boiling."

Gilliat thought the film was "underrated" and suffered from being released so closely after The Third Man. He also felt the film "suffered from Douglas Fairbanks Jnr, you needed a very warm personality and we got rather a cold one. But the picture otherwise came off, the thing was highly profitable, got good notices."

References

Bibliography

 Bawden, James and Ron Miller.  Conversations with Classic Film Stars: Interviews from Hollywood's Golden Era. Lexington, Kentucky: University Press of Kentucky, 2016. .
 Murphy, Robert. Realism and Tinsel: Cinema and Society in Britain 1939-48. London: Routledge, 2003, First edition 1992. .

External links

State Secret at BFI
Review of film at New York Times

1950 films
1950s thriller films
British thriller films
British black-and-white films
Films set in 1950
Films set in Europe
Films set in London
London Films films
Films directed by Sidney Gilliat
Films scored by William Alwyn
Films set in a fictional country
Films shot at Isleworth Studios
Films shot in Italy
1950s English-language films
1950s British films